Rob Palmer is a football commentator and sports broadcaster on Sky Sports, ESPN and other outlets around the world.

He has appeared on Sky Sports since 1996, originally joining from Granada Television to act as the North West correspondent for the Sports News channel.

His broadcasting career started at BBC Radio Humberside (alongside Sky Sports colleague Rob Hawthorne) and BBC Radio Merseyside.

Rob Palmer is most known for his commentary on Sky Sports (La Liga Coverage) over the years. He has commentated on the Clásico every year since 1996.

Footballer

He is a former goalkeeper with Derby County F.C.. Originally signed as a schoolboy, he played several seasons professionally in the development team and in the FA Youth Cup.

In 1983, he accepted a scholarship at the University of New Haven, Connecticut in the USA] to play football and take a BSc in Mass Media Communication.

He broke several NCAA records as The Chargers progressed to the Regional and National finals in 1984 and 1985. His roommate was Juan Carlos Osorio, who later would be the Mexico national team manager.

After returning to the UK, he played for several non-league football teams and Scunthorpe United.

He was given his break in television whilst playing for Bridlington Town. John Motson pulled out of reporting on "The Road to Wembley" FA Cup feature and Palmer, who was keeping goal for Bridlington was asked to step in as Motson's replacement.

Broadcaster and Journalist

Palmer started his journalism career in newspapers and a Midlands newsgathering agency.

He moved into radio in 1987 to work for BBC Radio Humberside and then BBC Radio Merseyside, commentating on Liverpool FC winning the League in 1990.

He has since established himself as a well-respected TV commentator, reporter and presenter.

Television commentator

He is currently heard as the commentator on Premier League matches around the world and Sky Sports on the official match feed. He also commentates on live EFL matches.

He is widely regarded as the 'voice of La Liga' in the UK and on TV stations that took the Sky feed of Spanish matches from 1996 to 2018.

Palmer also commentated on the UEFA Champions League when Sky Sports had the rights and continues to cover the major European games for DAZN in Canada and TV stations around the world.

During his stint at Granada TV, he covered live Sunday-afternoon matches and was often heard in other regions commentating on highlights, and on the late night Football League Extra programme in the 1994-95 and 1995-96 seasons and he also covered the 1994 World Cup for the ITV network.

His subsequent credits include: weekly appearances on Gillette Soccer Saturday, presenting stints on Soccer AM, Copa America, Football First, England Under 21s and Fishomania.

Rob is known for voice-overs for many Premier League football clubs including Manchester United, Liverpool FC, Everton, and Hull City.

He commentated on the 1994 World Cup for ITV, the Champions League Final 2010 (Sky 3D coverage) and Euro 96 for the host broadcaster. In recent years, he has guest commentated for DAZN in Canada, the Seattle Sounders.  He is resident guest on EuroConnect for SuperSport in South Africa and writes a weekly column on La Liga for the Sur In English newspaper.

He also presented and commentated on a variety of sports at the 2002 Commonwealth Games in Manchester. His voice has also appeared in TV shows such as Coronation Street and Cracker.

In 2021, Palmer joined ESPN's team of La Liga commentators.

Charity work

He is also a key fundraiser and ambassador for the children's cerebral palsy charity Stick 'n' Step.

He was voted as the 'Spirit of Merseyside' Celebrity Charity Champion (2010) at the Liverpool Anglican Cathedral in May 2010 - following Liverpool footballer Jamie Carragher who won the award in 2009. 
He hosts an annual golf tournament which is supported by many football legends including Robbie Fowler, Jason McAteer, Kevin Ratcliffe and Derek Mountfield.

He is married to Bronach and his son Ellis is a champion of disabled rights and BBC journalist.

References

External links
 Stick 'n' Step: charity helping children with cerebral palsy
www.liverpooldailypost.co.uk/.../2010/.../spirit-of-merseyside-awards-held-at-liverpool-cathedral-92534-26677345/

University of New Haven alumni
British association football commentators
English footballers
Association football goalkeepers
Derby County F.C. players
Living people
Year of birth missing (living people)